Crux Ansata, subtitled 'An Indictment of the Roman Catholic Church' by H. G. Wells is a (96-page) wartime book first published in 1943 by Penguin Books, Harmondsworth (Great Britain): Penguin Special No. 129. The U.S. edition was copyrighted and published in 1944 by Agora Publishing Company, New York, with a portrait  frontispiece and an  appendix of an interview with Wells recorded by John Rowland. The U.S. edition of 144 pages went into a third printing in August 1946.

H. G. Wells, living in London under the regular German Luftwaffe bombings from across the English Channel, extensively attacks Pope Pius XII and calls for the bombing of the city of Rome.

The book also forms a hostile history of the Roman Catholic Church, deeply imbued with anti-clericalism. Wells, an  atheist, had a long history of anti-Catholic writings spanning decades.

References

1943 non-fiction books
Books by H. G. Wells
Penguin Books books
Propaganda books and pamphlets
Pope Pius XII and World War II
Anti-Catholic publications